The following is a timeline of the history of the city of Seoul, South Korea.

Prior to 14th century

 18 BCE - Baekje, Wirye-seong, settled. Seoul started functioning as the royal capital of Baekje until 475.
 475 - Seoul changed hands from Baekje to Goguryeo.
 551 - Seoul changed hands from Goguryeo to Baekje.
 553 - Seoul changed hands from Baekje to Silla.
 901 - Seoul under control of Taebong as Silla became divided into three kingdoms.
 918 - Seoul became a part of newly founded Goryeo as the prior regime Taebong was overthrown.
 1104 - Sukjong of Goryeo builds a palace in Seoul and declared it the second capital 'Namgyeong' meaning 'Southern Capital'.

14th-18th century

 1394
 Capital of the Joseon Dynasty relocates to Seoul from Kaesong.
 Jongmyo (shrine) built.
 1395
 Gyeongbokgung Palace built.
 Jogyesa temple established.
 1396 - Fortress Wall construction begins.
 1398
 Eight Gates built.
 Sungkyunkwan founded.
 1412 - Changdeokgung Palace built.
 1414 - Namdaemun Market active.
 1447 - Namdaemun rebuilt.
 1467 - Wongaksa Pagoda constructed.
 1592 - April: City taken by Japanese forces.

18th-19th century
 1711 - Donuimun and Gwanghuimun (gates) rebuilt.
 1741 - Changuimun (gate) rebuilt.
 1796 - Hwaseong Fortress built.
 1867 - Gwanghwamun (gate) reconstructed.
 1897
 Kurisudo sinmun newspaper begins publication.
 Independence Gate erected.
 1898 - Myeongdong Cathedral consecrated.
 1899 - Gwallim Middle School established.
 1900
 Gyeongseong Station opens.
 Incheon-Seoul and Chemulpo-Seoul railways begin operating.

20th century

1900s-1950s
 1901 – Busan-Seoul railway begins operating.
 1905
 Uiju-Seoul railway begins operating.
 Dongdaemun Market in business.
 1906 – Keijō Nippō newspaper established.
 1907 – Seoul Sanitation Association founded.
 1908 – Gyeongseong Gamok (prison) in operation.
 1910
 Japanese in power; city renamed "Keijō"
 Population: 200,000 (approximate).
 1914 – Outer parts of Gyeongseongbu were ceded to Goyang County.
 1915 – Joseon Industrial Exhibition held in Gyeongbokgung
 1920 – Chosun Ilbo and Dong-a Ilbo newspapers begin publication.
 1922 – Namsan Public Library established.
 1924 – Keijō Imperial University founded.
 1925 – Seoul Station opens.
 1926 – Japanese General Government Building constructed.
 1927 – Noryangjin Fish Market in business.
 1936 – The expansion of Gyeongseongbu was implemented absorbing Cheongnyangni, Anam, Sincheon, etc.
 1940 – Joseon Grand Exposition held in Seoul 
 1945 – National Library of Korea and National Museum of Korea established.
 1946
 City renamed "Seoul" (approximate date).
 Kim Hyongmin becomes mayor.
 Seoul National University established.
 1947 – Samsung Sanghoe in business.
 1948
 City becomes capital of Republic of Korea.
 Seoul Philharmonic Orchestra founded.
 1949
 Seoul designated a special city (administrative division).
 Expended to today's Gangbuk-gu to the north and Guro-dong, Sindorim-dong(including today's Daerim dong) to the south.
 Population: 1,446,019.
 1950
 28 June: Hangang Bridge bombing; city taken by North Korean army.
 16 July: Yongsan bombing.
 22–25 September: Second Battle of Seoul.
 1951
 January: Third Battle of Seoul.
 14 March: City taken by United Nations forces.
 1953 – Korean Republic newspaper begins publication.
 1954 – Hankook Ilbo newspaper begins publication.
 1958 – Gimpo International Airport in operation.

1960s-1990s
 1960 – Gyeongdong Market in business.
 1963 – The great expansion was implemented, incorporating parts of counties of Gimpo, Gwangju, Siheung, Yangju, and Bucheon.
 1965 – Population: 3,793,280.
 1969 – N Seoul Tower built.
 1970
 Gyeongbu Expressway constructed.
 Population: 5,433,198.
 1973
 Jingwan-dong (Gupabal) was incorporated to Seoul from Goyang County.
 World Taekwondo Headquarters established.
 1974
 Seoul Metropolitan Subway begins operating.
 Korean Film Archive and Chugye University for the Arts established.
 1975 – Sister city relationship established with San Francisco, USA.
 1977 – Jeongdok Public Library opens.
 1978 – Sejong Center built.
 1980 - Population: 8,364,379.
 1982 – Banpo Bridge constructed.
 1983
 Lucky-Goldstar Football Club formed.
 Bukhansan National Park established.
 1985
 63 Building constructed.
 Population: 9,639,110.
 1986 – Asian Games held.
 1988
 Goh Kun becomes mayor.
 Summer Olympics held.
 Seoul Museum of Art and Calligraphy Museum open.
 Trade Tower built.
 1989 – Lotte World recreation complex opens.
 1990 – Population: 10,612,577.
 1991
 Blue House (government residence) built.
 KBS Hall opens.
 1993
 Korea National University of Arts established.
 Opera House opens.
 War Memorial of Korea constructed.
 1994 – Hi! Seoul Festival begins.
 1995
 The city boundary between Seoul and Gwangmyeong was rearranged, absorbing a very tiny part of Cheolsan-dong.
 The city boundary between Seoul and Goyang was rearranged, absorbing a very tiny part of Jichuk-dong.
 29 June: Sampoong Department Store collapse.
 Population: 10,776,201 (approximate estimate).
 1999 – Jongno Tower built.
 2000
 Bukchon Preservation and Regeneration Project established.
 Kumho Art Hall opens.

21st century

 2001
 Incheon International Airport begins operating.
 Seoul World Cup Stadium opens.
 ETP music festival begins.
 2002
 FIFA World Cup held.
 Lee Myung-bak becomes mayor.
 Seoul Museum of History established.
 2003 - Hyperion Tower built.
 2004
 Samsung Tower Palace built.
 Seoul Station renovated.
 Seoul Metropolitan Government Amazones football club formed.
 2005 - Seoul Forest opens.
 2006 - Oh Se-hoon becomes mayor.
 2009
 Moonlight Rainbow Fountain installed.
 West Seoul Lake Park opens.
 2010 - November: G-20 summit held.
 2011
 June: Floods.
 October: Asian Network of Major Cities 21 meeting held.
 Park Won-soon becomes mayor.
 Population: 10,581,728.
 Shinbundang Line opens
 2012
 International Finance Center Seoul opens
 ABU Radio Song Festival held.
 Seoul City Hall rebuilt.
 2014 - Dongdaemun Design Plaza opens
 2015 - Gocheok Sky Dome opens
 2016 - March: AI AlphaGo versus Lee Sedol match played.
 2018 - Population: 9,962,393
 2022
 29 October: Seoul Halloween crowd crush

See also
 History of Seoul
 List of districts of Seoul
 List of neighbourhoods of Seoul
 Names of Seoul
 List of mayors of Seoul
 List of museums in Seoul
 List of Buddhist temples in Seoul
 List of universities and colleges in Seoul
 Timeline of Korean history
 List of cities by population density

References

Bibliography

External links

Years in South Korea
Years in Korea

Seoul
Seoul
seoul
Seoul